The 1976 All-Ireland Under-21 Hurling Championship was the 13th staging of the All-Ireland Under-21 Hurling Championship since its establishment by the Gaelic Athletic Association in 1964.

Kilkenny were the defending champions.

On 19 September 1976, Cork won the championship following a 2-17 to 1-8 defeat of Kilkenny in the All-Ireland final. This was their 7th All-Ireland title in the under-21 grade and their first in three championship seasons.

Results

Leinster Under-21 Hurling Championship

Final

Munster Under-21 Hurling Championship

First round

Semi-finals

Final

All-Ireland Under-21 Hurling Championship

Semi-finals

Final

References

Under
All-Ireland Under-21 Hurling Championship